The white-eyed tody-tyrant (Hemitriccus zosterops) is a species of bird in the family Tyrannidae, the tyrant flycatchers.

It is found in the northern Amazon Basin of Brazil and the Guianas of French Guiana, Suriname, and southeast Guyana; also Amazonian Colombia, Venezuela, Ecuador and Peru.

It is a small short-tailed bird, medium grayish and olive-greenish with fleckings of deep black and white on its wings. It has a short sharp stout black bill, and is named for its narrow white eye-ring and its white eyes.

Its natural habitats are subtropical or tropical moist lowland forests and subtropical or tropical dry shrubland. In the Amazon Basin it is only found north of the Amazon River; in Venezuela it is in the headwaters of the Orinoco River in the south.

References

External links
"White-eyed tody-tyrant" photo gallery VIREO Photo-High Res--(Close-up)
Photo and Article oiseaux

white-eyed tody-tyrant
Birds of the Amazon Basin
Birds of the Guianas
Birds of the Colombian Amazon
Birds of the Venezuelan Amazon
Birds of the Peruvian Amazon
Birds of the Ecuadorian Amazon
white-eyed tody-tyrant
Taxonomy articles created by Polbot